The following television stations broadcast on digital channel 16 in Mexico:

 XHATZ-TDT on Altzomoni, State of Mexico
 XHBAC-TDT in Bacerac, Sonora
 XHBD-TDT in Zacatecas, Zacatecas
 XHBZ-TDT in Colima, Colima
 XHCCS-TDT in Cananea, Sonora
 XHCTIX-TDT in Pachuca, Hidalgo
 XHCTLV-TDT in Coatzacoalcos, Veracruz
 XHCTOX-TDT in Oaxaca, Oaxaca
 XHDE-TDT in San Luis Potosí, San Luis Potosí
 XHDVS-TDT in Divisadero, Sonora
 XHENE-TDT in Ensenada, Baja California
 XHHR-TDT in Ojinaga, Chihuahua
 XHKW-TDT in Morelia, Michoacán
 XHQBI-TDT in Querobabi, Sonora
 XHSCC-TDT in San Cristóbal de Las Casas, Chiapas
 XHTPZ-TDT in Tampico, Tamaulipas
 XHUNES-TDT in Durango, Durango

16